Peugeot 5CV was a popular name for several models of the Peugeot Type 172 between 1925 and 1929.

Debut
The first of the 5CV series was the Type 172 BC, itself a new model, though similar to the Quadrilette, which was still sold through 1924. It debuted at the Tour de France automobile in 1924.

Models
Small styling changes and a new engine changed the Type 172 BC into the Type 172 R in 1926. The engine was a 720 cc I4 and produced the same power rating as before, but torque was quoted appreciably higher. A smaller engine and a wider track nevertheless lowered the rating of the new Type 172 M tax classification to 4CV.

Production
Total production of the Type 172 models in this timeframe amounted to 48,285 units.


References
5CV Type 172 BC
Peugeot Car Models 1910-1949

5CV
Cars introduced in 1924